The Long Island Lighting Company, or LILCO [ "lil-co" ], was an electrical power company and natural gas utility for the communities of Long Island, New York, serving  2.7 million people in Nassau, Suffolk and Queens Counties.  LILCO was the power utility for Long Island from 1911 until 1998.

History

Formation 

It was founded by Ellis Laurimore Phillips, an engineer, and a group of New York City investors, including George W. Olmsted.  At the time, Long Island had multiple small power utilities that served individual villages; their business plan was to acquire these an interconnect them into an island-wide grid.  In 1911, their first purchases were four small electric companies in Amityville, Islip, Northport and Sayville.

The Glenwood Generating Station was constructed from 1928 to 1931. The extra generating capacity was needed due to a sixfold increase in Long Island's electricity demand from 1910 to 1925. The expansion also reflected LILCO's then-novel philosophy of using few centralized power plants interconnected by transmission lines, rather than many small plants distributed through the region. In 1936 it was described as "the key electric generating plant of the Long Island system," and its control room managed LILCO's entire system.

Mid-century expansion 

LILCO greatly increased its generating facilities to meet increasing power demands created by Long Island's postwar population growth.  In the 1950s, two new units were constructed at the Glenwood Generating Station, and two at the new E. F. Barrett Power Station, and one at the new Far Rockaway Power Station.  At the time The New York Times called the Glenwood Generating Station "one of the most modern power plants in the country," with both mechanical and electrostatic precipitators for dust and ash collection, as well as valve silencers and noise barriers.  It was the first turbine generator mounted on an open deck in the Northeastern United States.  Four units were also constructed at the Port Jefferson Power Station between 1948 and 1960.

The four units of the Northport Power Station, constructed between 1967 and 1977, became Long Islands largest power plant.  In addition to the large steam turbine plants, LILCO built a large number of smaller gas turbine generators in the early 1970s, most of them at the E. F. Barrett Power Station and at a new facility in Holtsville.

Difficulties 
LILCO was long notorious for its high rates. Indeed, according to a 1999 article in The New York Times, LILCO's rates were considered part of an "unholy trinity of life on Long Island", along with the Long Island Rail Road's service woes and traffic snarls on the Long Island Expressway.

Hurricane Gloria hit Long Island on September 27, 1985, but power was not fully restored until October 8.  The utility's poor response to the storm further eroded public confidence in LILCO's ability to handle an emergency and placed increased pressure to shutter the LILCO built Shoreham Nuclear Power Plant. Two years earlier, the Suffolk County legislature resolved that the county could not be safely evacuated in the event of an emergency. In an effort to show they were prepared for the event of a nuclear mishap at Shoreham, LILCO created a volunteer organization, staffed by Shoreham engineers and various staff from LILCO itself, named LERO (Local Emergency Response Organization) to provide assistance to the public. In the end, in a political decision born from LILCO's inability to present a viable evacuation plan for Suffolk County, Shoreham was closed down in 1992 after never having operated at more than minimum power for testing purposes.

Demise and aftermath 
LILCO's assets were bought by the Long Island Power Authority (LIPA), a public authority.  On March 5, 1998, final Federal approval was received for LIPA to take over LILCO's electrical transmission network. The deal was completed later that year. The rest of LILCO, including its electrical generation and natural gas businesses, merged with Brooklyn Union Gas to form KeySpan, which continued to run LILCO's old transmission network under contract with LIPA.  KeySpan was taken over by National Grid USA in 2007.  National Grid handed control of Long Island's electrical transmission system to New Jersey utility Public Service Enterprise Group in 2014.

Major power plants 
All locations are in New York.

In addition to the major plants, LILCO constructed smaller gas turbine plants at the above facilities and in East Hampton North, Holtsville, Southampton, Southold, and West Babylon.

References

External links 
 LILCO website from 1996

Electric power companies of the United States
Nuclear power companies of the United States
Companies based in Nassau County, New York
Energy infrastructure on Long Island, New York